The list of countries by UNODC homicide rate is typically expressed in units of deaths per 100,000 individuals per year. A homicide rate of 30 (out of 100,000) corresponds to 0.03% of the population dying by homicide. The reliability of underlying national murder rate data may vary. Only UNODC-vetted data is used in the main table below. In some cases it may not be as up to date as other sources. See further down as to why its data is used over other sources.

Research suggests that intentional homicide demographics are affected by changes in trauma care, leading to changed lethality of violent assaults, so the intentional homicide rate may not necessarily indicate the overall level of societal violence. They may also be under-reported for political reasons.

A study undertaken by the Geneva Declaration on Armed Violence and Development estimated that there were approximately 490,000 intentional homicides in 2004. The study estimated that the global rate was 7.6 intentional homicides per 100,000 inhabitants for 2004. UNODC calculated a rate of 6.9 in 2010. UNODC (United Nations Office on Drugs and Crime) reported a global average intentional homicide rate of 6.2 per 100,000 population for 2012 (in their report titled "Global Study on Homicide 2013"). In the 2019 edition, the global rate was estimated at 6.1 per 100,000 for 2017.

Definition

Intentional homicide is defined by the United Nations Office on Drugs and Crime (UNODC) in its Global Study on Homicide report thus:

Though some discrepancies exist in how specific categories of intentional killings are classified, the definitions used by countries to record data are generally close to the UNODC definition, making the homicide rates highly comparable at the international level. UNODC uses the homicide rate as a proxy for overall violence, as this type of crime is one of the most accurately reported and internationally comparable indicators.

Figures from the Global Study on Homicide are based on the UNODC Homicide Statistics dataset, which is derived from the criminal justice or public health systems of a variety of countries and territories. The homicide rates derived from criminal justice data (typically recorded by police authorities) and the public health system data (recorded when the cause of death is established) may diverge substantially for some countries. The two sources usually match in the Americas, Europe and Oceania, but there are large discrepancies for the three African countries reporting both sources. For the 70 countries in which neither source was made available, figures were derived from WHO statistical models.

Deaths resulting from an armed conflict between states are never included in the count. Killings caused by a non-international armed conflict may or may not be included, depending on the intensity of hostilities and whether it is classified as 'civil unrest' or a clash between organized armed groups.

UNODC's global study

All data in this section comes from the United Nations Office on Drugs and Crime (UNODC) website.

By region

Rates vary widely within regions. See info on secondary sorting within regions and subregions below.

By country, region, or dependent territory

The regions and subregions in the table are based on the United Nations geoscheme since the table sources are United Nations Office on Drugs and Crime (UNODC) reports. The U.N. recognizes that variabilities in the quality and integrity of data provided by certain countries may minimize country murder rates.

There is a total yearly count of homicides for each country. Rates are calculated per 100,000 inhabitants. When the regions or subregions are sorted the countries are also alphabetically sorted within those regions or subregions. Then shift-click rates or counts to secondarily sort countries by rates or counts within the regions or subregions previously sorted.

* (Asterisk) in Location column indicates a dedicated article about crime in the specific country or area.

Source abbreviations explained

Other multi-country studies
A 2020 study by InSight Crime found that Jamaica had the highest homicide rate in Latin America and the Caribbean, while Venezuela had the second highest rate.

See also

References

Sources
  Look for page numbers on the bottom of pages, and ignore the incorrect page numbers provided by your PDF reader.

External links

 The Homicide Monitor map. Made by Brazil-based think tank, The Igarapé Institute.

Homicide rate
Homicide
Country
Murder by country
Homicide rate
Homicide rate